The Veszprém Wind Farm is an under construction wind power project in Veszprém County, Hungary. It will have 30 individual wind turbines with a nominal output of around 2 MW which will deliver up to 60 MW of power, enough to power over 40,100 homes, with a capital investment required of approximately US$225 million.

References

Proposed wind farms in Hungary
Buildings and structures in Veszprém County